Desmond O'Grady (born 1953) is an Irish former Gaelic footballer who played as a left wing-back at senior level for the Cork county team.

Born in Togher, Cork, O'Grady first played competitive football during his youth. He arrived on the inter-county scene at the age of twenty-one when he first linked up with the Cork under-21 team. He made his senior debut during the 1977 championship. O'Grady was a regular member of the team for just one season. He was a Munster runner-up on one occasion.

At club level O'Grady is a one-time All-Ireland medallist with St Finbarr's. In addition to this he also won two Munster medals and three championship medals.

His brother, Dónal, was an All-Ireland medallist as a player and as a manager with the Cork senior hurling team.

In 2014, O'Grady was elected to Cork County Council as a Sinn Féin member.

Honours
St Finbarr's
All-Ireland Senior Club Football Championship (1): 1981
Munster Senior Club Football Championship (2): 1979, 1980
Cork Senior Club Football Championship (3): 1976, 1979, 1980

Cork
Munster Under-21 Football Championship (1): 1974 (sub)

References

1953 births
Living people
Cork inter-county Gaelic footballers
Irish schoolteachers
Irish sportsperson-politicians
Local councillors in County Cork
Sinn Féin politicians
St Finbarr's Gaelic footballers